Talondo is a minor Austronesian language of Sulawesi, Indonesia.

References

Languages of Sulawesi
South Sulawesi languages